Hoddevik is a village and surf beach in Stad Municipality in Vestland county, Norway. The village is located on the western coast of the Stadlandet peninsula.

Hoddevik has good surf as it is exposed to west swells, but remains very wind-sheltered due to the surrounding high mountains. The white sand beach and a local surf-hostel add to Hoddevik's appeal.

Around 14 people live year-round in the village (as of 2022).

References

Villages in Vestland
Stad, Norway